Fred Cooper (31 May 1910 – 1992) was a British sports shooter. He competed in the 25 metre pistol and the 50 metre pistol events at the 1956 Summer Olympics.

References

1910 births
1992 deaths
British male sport shooters
Olympic shooters of Great Britain
Shooters at the 1956 Summer Olympics
Place of birth missing